Sean Sweeney (born 15 June 1956) was a Scottish footballer who played for Clyde, Stenhousemuir, Dumbarton and Stranraer.

References

1956 births
Scottish footballers
Dumbarton F.C. players
Clyde F.C. players
Stenhousemuir F.C. players
Stranraer F.C. players
Scottish Football League players
Living people
Association football forwards